Greaseproof paper is paper that is impermeable to oil or grease, and is normally used in cooking or food packaging. It is usually produced by refining the paper stock  and thus creating a sheet with very low porosity. This is then passed between hard pressure rollers (supercalendered) to further increase the density, creating a paper called glassine. The glassine is treated with starches, alginates or carboxymethyl cellulose (CMC) in a size press to fill pores or treat the paper chemically to make it fat repellent. Basis weights are usually 30–50 g/m2.

See also
 Darcy (unit)
 Parchment paper
 Permeability (earth sciences)
 Permeation
 Wax paper

References

External links 
 Greaseproof Board

Paper
Food preparation utensils